Megasporoporia minuta is a species of crust fungus in the family Polyporaceae. Found in the Guangxi Autonomous Region of southern China, it was described as a new species in 2008 by mycologists Xu-Shen Zhou and Yu-Cheng Dai. The fungus produces annual to biennial fruit bodies with small pores, numbering 6–8 per millimetre. The spores are cylindrical to oblong-ellipsoid and measure 7.7–9.7 by 3.6–4.9 μm. The hymenium lacks both hyphal pegs and dendrohyphidia.

References

Fungi of China
Fungi described in 2008
Polyporaceae
Taxa named by Yu-Cheng Dai